The red-shouldered blackbird (Agelaius assimilis) is a species of bird in the family Icteridae. It is endemic to Cuba, but despite its limited range, the species is listed as Least Concern on the IUCN Red List.

References

Agelaius
Endemic birds of Cuba
Birds described in 1850
Taxa named by Juan Lembeye
Taxonomy articles created by Polbot